Gary McDaid is a Gaelic football manager, referee and former player. He has three DSFCs: twice as joint manager (2011, 2013) and once as coach to Michael Canning (2016).

Club
While overseeing Glenswilly, he has helped that team to two Donegal Senior Football Championships (2011 and 2013). They also won the 2013 All-County Football League Division Two title. He took a year off in 2012. He was part of Michael Canning's backroom team in 2016 as Glenswilly won their third county title. He played with the reserves that year.

County
McDaid publicly criticised the county board in 2011. He has been involved in coaching Donegal underage squads and has worked under the leadership of Joe McBrearty with Donegal's under-21 football team.

In December 2014, it was announced that McDaid had joined the senior Donegal county team as a selector under the stewardship of Rory Gallagher. This coincided with introduction of Eamon Ward and Joe Gibbons from his home club Glenswilly, as well as the return of Gary McFadden, who had opted out in 2013. He stayed for one season. In October 2015, he stood aside from the role, citing family commitments.

McDaid was considered a leading contender to succeed Gallagher as Donegal senior manager, though Declan Bonner accepted the post. In November 2017, McDaid was ratified as the first manager of the new Donegal under-20 football team. Eamon McGee, Francie Friel and Brian Roper completed his back-room team.

He carried on in 2018, developing players such as Jason McGee and Odhrán McFadden Ferry for Bonner's main team.

But he gave up — unexpectedly — and, admitting "results had not been as good as they had hoped" (shifting the emphasis of blame onto others), announced his resignation in an interview he gave to Highland Radio on 28 September 2019. For him to complete his expected third year at the helm, McDaid would have had to "face an interview", the thought of which was too much for him.

Media
"There are few more articulate, astute or acute observers of Donegal GAA than one Gary McDaid from Glenswilly. He will always be remembered for masterminding a great victory for the Glen over hot favourites Kilcar in the county final of 2016… and his attention to detail has always been quite forensic". This was how media asssed him while seeking his views on the 2020 Donegal Senior Football Championship.

Of Hugh McFadden, McDaid said that he reminded him of a "young Michael Murphy".

In 2016, McDaid hit out a people sitting in armchairs. He was particularly sensitive to the criticism of Glenswilly when his club had ground out a win on a score of 3 points against the 2 points to which they had limited their opponents. "We'd 14 wides, five dropped short and we scored three… I saw a lot of stuff on social media that it's the end of football and [other stuff] about mass defences", McDaid told Gaelic Life.

Referee
McDaid is also a referee,is he as bad as Leo ?.

Personal life
McDaid teaches PE at St Eunan's College to Transition Year students, as well as the new Leaving Certificate PE course which the college is currently piloting. McDaid has also been part of various Gaelic football teams during his time at St Eunan's, most notably hitching on the back of the MacLarnon Cup-winning team of 2014 after they reached the final.

As well as teaching, McDaid is an avid runner. His most noted achievement occurred when he broke the 20-minute barrier for five kilometres in the annual Glenswilly GAA 5k Road Race.

References

Year of birth missing (living people)
Living people
Gaelic games players from County Donegal
Gaelic football managers
Gaelic football referees
Gaelic football selectors
Glenswilly Gaelic footballers
Irish schoolteachers
People associated with St Eunan's College